Rover is an unincorporated community in western Oregon County, in the U.S. state of Missouri. The community lies approximately eleven miles west of Alton and is on Missouri Route M, 1.5 miles south of U.S. Route 160.

History
A post office called Rover was established in 1900, and remained in operation until 1945. The community was named after Rover, the dog of an early postmaster.

References

Unincorporated communities in Oregon County, Missouri
Unincorporated communities in Missouri